Capoeta pestai, called the Eğirdir longsnout scraper or the Eğirdir barb, is a critically endangered freshwater fish species in the family Cyprinidae, found only in Turkey. It used to be common across Lake Eğirdir in central Anatolia, but survives only in one of the inflowing rivers. It was forced out of Lake Eğirdir by a combination of overfishing, irrigation, destruction of its habitat, and the induction of predatory alien fish species.

References

 
 

Pestai
Endemic fauna of Turkey
Fish described in 1933
Taxonomy articles created by Polbot
Taxa named by Viktor Pietschmann